The Netherlands women's national under-20 basketball team is a national basketball team of the Netherlands, administered by the Basketball Nederland. It represents the country in women's international under-20 basketball competitions.

FIBA U20 Women's European Championship participations

See also
Netherlands women's national basketball team
Netherlands women's national under-19 basketball team

References

External links
Archived records of the Netherlands team participations

Basketball in the Netherlands
Basketball
Women's national under-20 basketball teams